Kingsman is a British-American fictional spy action comedy film series that Matthew Vaughn co-produced and directed and 20th Century Fox distributed. Based on the Icon Comics graphic novel by Mark Millar and Dave Gibbons, the series consisted of three films with the list of characters in the table below.

Characters table

Kingsman
Kingsman is set as a privately owned spy organisation in the United Kingdom in the films universe. It was originally founded in 1849 as a prestigious tailor shop in London's Savile Row (which is actually H. Huntsman & Sons), but when its clients lost their heirs to World War I, Kingsman turned its attention to secretly protecting the country without the legal and political constraints of government organisations, channeling their money into the organisation now that they no longer had any family to inherit. Kingsman agents are characterized by their bespoke bulletproof suits, Oxford shoes, and eyeglasses equipped with audio-visual communications, as well as their gentlemanly mannerisms. Their codenames are taken from the knights of the Round Table. Following the destruction of all Kingsman property at the hands of the Golden Circle, Kingsman Tailors is relocated on St James's Street between Lock & Co. Hatters and Berry Bros. & Rudd.

Agents
Harry Hart / Galahad Sr.
Harry Hart (Colin Firth) is a Kingsman agent who operates under the codename "Galahad". He is based on Jack London from the graphic novel. Prior to joining Kingsman, he was studying to become a lepidopterist, but he joined the British Army instead. While training to become a Kingsman agent, Harry raised a Cairn Terrier he named "Mr. Pickle" for 11 years until it died of pancreatitis, then had it preserved for display in his home. He memorialises his missions by posting front pages of The Sun on the wall of his study room, each presenting an ordinary headline from the date of an assignment. During a mission in the Middle East in 1997, Kingsman trainee Lee Unwin sacrificed himself to save Harry's team from a suicide bomber. Because of this, Harry brings Lee's son Eggsy into the organisation while grooming him to become a gentleman. While investigating a string of kidnappings linked to billionaire philanthropist Richmond Valentine, Harry finds himself involved in a massacre in a Kentucky church that is instigated by neurological waves transmitted through Valentine's SIM cards. Just as Valentine reveals his plan to commit a worldwide culling with the neurological waves, he shoots Harry in the left eye.

Harry survives the gunshot due to timely medical attention by the American spy organisation Statesman, but he loses his left eye and suffers retrograde amnesia. He remains in Statesman's custody for over a year, during which time he mentally reverts to the period of his life before he joined the British Army. After several failed attempts to snap Harry out of his amnesia, Eggsy brings in a puppy resembling Mr. Pickle and threatens to shoot it, triggering Harry's memories. Despite overcoming his amnesia, Harry experiences occasional butterfly hallucinations and impaired reactions due to a loss of depth perception and being out of practice.

Gary "Eggsy" Unwin / Galahad Jr.
Gary Unwin (Taron Egerton), better known as "Eggsy", is an antisocial Chav who is recruited into Kingsman by Harry. He is based on Gary London from the graphic novel. In the years since the death of his father, Eggsy has fallen into delinquency. He excelled at gymnastics before pressure from his stepfather Dean forced him to quit. He dropped out of the Royal Marines due to his mother's fear of losing him like his father. Eggsy has a high I.Q. and exceptional driving skills, but his life of crime has prevented him from getting any job. Upon his entry into the Kingsman training program, Eggsy becomes the outcast, as the other candidates are well educated and come from wealthy families. He overcomes bullying from Charlie Hesketh and the other male trainees to become a finalist alongside Roxanne Morton; however, he ultimately loses when he fails the final test, which involves shooting his pug J.B. (which he named after Jack Bauer). Unknown to Eggsy, the gun was loaded with blanks. Upon discovering Valentine's ulterior motives and thwarting Arthur's attempt to kill him, Eggsy teams up with Merlin and Roxy to stop Valentine from killing billions with his neurological wave broadcast. After Harry is shot by Valentine and left for dead, his codename of Galahad passes to Eggsy.

In Kingsman: The Golden Circle, Eggsy has since inherited Harry's home and is in a relationship with Crown Princess Tilde of Sweden, who he saved during the Valentine incident. One night, he has dinner with the Royal Family of Sweden, which indirectly saves him from being killed along with all the other Kingsman agents in Britain in the hands of the Golden Circle. Eggsy and Merlin get help from the American spy organisation Statesman to figure out the Golden Circle's motives, only to discover that Harry is alive and has been under their care for over a year. Eggsy marries Princess Tilde after he and Harry save the world from the Golden Circle's virus outbreak.

Hamish Mycroft / Merlin
Hamish Mycroft, also known as "Merlin" (Mark Strong), is Kingsman's Scottish tech support officer and head of recruit training. He is based on Rupert Greaves from the graphic novel. In 1997, Merlin's life was saved along with Harry by Eggsy's father. Upon the revelation of Arthur working with Valentine, Merlin brings Eggsy and Roxy directly to Valentine's secret lair, as it is unknown which other Kingsman agents have sided with Valentine. The trio successfully stop Valentine's plan with their teamwork.

In Kingsman: The Golden Circle, Merlin and Eggsy are the two surviving members of Kingsman after the organisation is wiped out by Poppy's missiles (Eggsy was out of his house when it was bombed and Merlin's address was not listed on the hacked database Poppy used to target them). Following the Doomsday Protocol, they team up with their American counterpart Statesman in their mission to stop the Golden Circle from killing millions of people affected by their drugs. Upon their arrival at the Golden Circle's lair in Cambodia, Merlin saves Eggsy from a land mine by temporarily freezing the trigger mechanism and putting his own weight on it, returning the favor of Eggsy's father saving his life. In order to give Harry and Eggsy an opening, he distracts the guards by singing "Take Me Home, Country Roads" (by his favourite singer John Denver), causing them to surround him. Once surrounded, he steps off the landmine, killing himself and the guards.

Chester King / Arthur
Chester King (Michael Caine), codename "Arthur", is the leader of Kingsman in Kingsman: The Secret Service. He is based on Sir Giles from the graphic novel. Arthur does not see Eggsy as a likely candidate for the organisation due to his lower-class background; he is further frustrated when Charlie, his preferred candidate, is eliminated in the program. Following the church incident, Eggsy discovers that Arthur made a deal with Valentine after spotting a surgical scar on his neck. Arthur attempts to kill Eggsy with a glass of poisoned brandy, but dies instead when Eggsy surreptitiously switches glasses with him. With his dying breath, Arthur curses Eggsy in a Cockney accent, indicating that he is not as aristocratic as he appears to be.

Roxanne "Roxy" Morton / Lancelot
Roxanne "Roxy" Morton (Sophie Cookson) is a Kingsman trainee and Eggsy's best friend throughout the program. She was selected and introduced into the selection process by Kingsman agent Percival. When it is just her and Eggsy as the last two contenders, she beats him and becomes the new "Lancelot" by showing willingness to shoot her training dog (although the round is actually a blank). When Arthur is revealed to be part of Valentine's planned mass genocide, Eggsy and Merlin recruit Roxy as the only Kingsman they can be sure isn't part of Valentine's scheme. While Eggsy and Merlin infiltrate Valentine's compound, Roxy overcomes her fear of heights and successfully disrupts the neurological wave broadcast by destroying one of Valentine's satellites.

Roxy makes a brief appearance in Kingsman: The Golden Circle, covertly feeding information and conversation points to Eggsy during his dinner with Crown Princess Tilde and her parents. She and the other Kingsman agents in Britain, except Eggsy and Merlin, are killed by missiles fired by Poppy Adams' terrorist organisation The Golden Circle.

James Spencer / Lancelot
James Spencer (Jack Davenport) is the original "Lancelot" in Kingsman: The Secret Service. Whilst on a mission in 1997, both he, Harry, and Merlin were saved by Lee Unwin, who sacrificed himself by jumping on a suicide bomber. While attempting to rescue Professor James Arnold in Argentina, he is sliced in half by Valentine's henchwoman Gazelle.

Lady Sophie Montague-Herring
Lady Sophie Montague-Herring (Lily Travers) is a target that Eggsy, Roxy, and Charlie must seduce at a London night club as part of their training. She is actually bait for the trio to fall into the interrogation test, suggesting she works in some capacity for Kingsman.

Interrogator
The Interrogator (Richard Brake) has each of the final three Kingsman trainees tied to a railroad track in front of an oncoming train before asking them about the organisation. Eggsy and Roxy pass the test by refusing to divulge any information, while Charlie fails by fully confessing to the Interrogator, much to Arthur's disappointment. Regardless of the outcome, each trainee is lowered safely beneath the track just before the train can run over him/her.

Sir Giles / Arthur
Sir Giles (Michael Gambon) is Chester King's replacement as "Arthur" in Kingsman: The Golden Circle. He is killed when a missile fired by the Golden Circle destroys the Kingsman tailor shop.

Trainees
Amelia
Amelia (Fiona Hampton) is a female Kingsman trainee. During the first test, in which the trainees' dormitory is filled with water, she appeared to drown before Eggsy saved himself and the team. Harry later revealed to Eggsy that Amelia was not a trainee, but an undercover Kingsman staff member planted within the group who faked her death to help solidify the high stakes of the training. She works in the tech department at Kingsman's Berlin branch.

Rufus
Rufus (Jack Cutmore-Scott) is part of Charlie Hesketh's clique in the training program. He is eliminated in the skydiving test after deploying his parachute at a high enough altitude to be detected by Merlin's radar.

Hugo Higins and Digby Barker
Hugo Higins (Tom Prior) and Digby Barker (Nicholas Banks) are part of Charlie's clique. They are both eliminated in the skydiving test for failing to land on the target.

Founders
Orlando Oxford / Arthur
Orlando, Duke of Oxford (Ralph Fiennes) is the founder of the Kingsman agency and the first member to bear the codename "Arthur". He served the British Army during the Mahdist War; his services earned him the Victoria Cross. After having grown weary of the bloodshed he committed, he joined the British Red Cross alongside his wife Emily. Upon the Oxfords' arrival at a concentration camp in South Africa during the Second Boer War in 1902, Emily is killed during a Boer sniper attack. Because of this incident, Orlando is extremely protective of his son Conrad, as he made a promise to Emily not to let their son see a war. Prior to the outbreak of World War I, Orlando organises a global spy network consisting of domestic helpers. Orlando initially walks with a limp due to a gunshot wound on his left thigh sustained during the Second Boer War, but during his spy team's mission in Petrograd, the monk Rasputin uses his unorthodox techniques to heal the wound before his team successfully kills Rasputin. He loses all hope after Conrad is killed in the Western Front, but he commits himself to carry on his son's legacy and close in on the mastermind behind World War I. Upon arriving at the Flock's stronghold, Orlando engages the Shepherd in a sword fight before sending him falling off the cliff.

At the end of the war, Orlando fears that the Treaty of Versailles may lead to another global war due to its severe punishments on Germany. In response, he purchases Kingsman Tailors and converts it into the Kingsman agency.

Polly Wilkins / Galahad
Polyanna "Polly" Wilkins (Gemma Arterton) is a maid employed to the Oxford family. In reality, she is also part of Orlando's spy network and is a skillful sniper. Polly makes a Bakewell tart laced with cyanide to assassinate the Russian monk Grigori Rasputin, but the plan fails due to Rasputin's immunity to poison, and following a fight with Shola and Orlando, Rasputin is shot in the head by Polly. Upon the formation of the Kingsman agency, she becomes the first agent to bear the codename "Galahad".

Shola / Merlin
Shola (Djimon Hounsou) is a driver and bodyguard employed to the Oxford family. Upon the formation of the Kingsman agency, he becomes its first quartermaster, bearing the codename "Merlin".

George V / Percival
George V (Tom Hollander) is the King of the United Kingdom during World War I. Prior to the outbreak of the war, he sends copies of his childhood photo to his cousins Kaiser Wilhelm II of Germany and Tsar Nicholas II of Russia in an attempt to calm them down, but they ignore his message and proceed to go to war. Upon the formation of the Kingsman agency, he becomes the first agent to bear the codename "Percival".

Archie Reid / Lancelot
Lance Corporal Archie Reid (Aaron Taylor-Johnson) is a member of the Grenadier Guards. When Conrad is ordered to pull out of the Western Front, he trades places with Archie and has him return to the Oxford mansion to send a message to Orlando. Upon the formation of the Kingsman agency, Archie becomes the first agent to bear the codename "Lancelot".

United States Ambassador / Bedivere
In The King's Man, the United States Ambassador to the United Kingdom (Stanley Tucci) informs Orlando that Mata Hari seduced President Woodrow Wilson and is blackmailing him with the filmed footage to keep the U.S. out of the war. Upon the formation of the Kingsman agency, the ambassador becomes the first agent to bear the codename "Bedivere". The ambassador is based on Walter Hines Page, who was the U.S. ambassador to the UK from 1913 to 1918.

Statesman
Statesman is set as American private spy organisation posing as a Bourbon whiskey distillery in Louisville, Kentucky in the films universe. They also have a large commercial office (which is actually the alternative MetLife Building) in New York City, and are listed on the New York Stock Exchange as STS with a net worth of over $3 billion. Statesman is the "American cousin" of Kingsman, with the agency's founder having utilised a Kingsman agent as his tailor. In contrast to Kingsman, Statesman agents wear more rugged suits, cowboy hats, leather boots, and aviator sunglasses that operate similarly to Kingsman eyeglasses. With the exception of Ginger Ale (see below), they are codenamed after alcoholic beverages.

Champagne
Champagne (Jeff Bridges), or "Champ", is the leader of Statesman. After Harry and Eggsy foil Poppy's plans, Champagne purchases a Scottish distillery, effectively helping Kingsman rebuild by bringing the organisation into the liquor business.

Tequila
Tequila (Channing Tatum) is the first Statesman agent to encounter Kingsman agents Eggsy and Merlin. In a conversation with Champ, it is suggested he came from humble beginnings much like Eggsy, working as a rodeo clown before joining Statesman. He is sidelined when he develops a blue rash all over his skin, the first symptom of the toxin that Poppy Adams has laced into the world's recreational drug supplies. When the blue rash worsens to a state of mania known as the "dancing disease", Ginger Ale has Tequila frozen in a cryogenic chamber to stabilise his health. After Poppy's antidote is released to the world population, Tequila recovers and moves to London to work for Kingsman.

Jack Daniels / Whiskey
Jack Daniels (Pedro Pascal), codename "Whiskey", is a Statesman agent based in the agency's New York office. When Tequila is sidelined with the blue rash, Whiskey is assigned to work with Eggsy and Harry in investigating the Golden Circle's activities. After Eggsy manages to steal an antidote sample from Poppy's factory in northern Italy, Whiskey purposefully breaks it during an ambush by the Golden Circle's henchmen. Seeing that Whiskey has an ulterior motive, Harry shoots him in the head. After a heated argument with Harry, Eggsy stabilises Whiskey with Alpha Gel. Whiskey recovers back at Statesman headquarters and tries to stop Eggsy and Harry from deploying the antidote, revealing that he wants all drug users dead after his pregnant wife was shot and killed by two methamphetamine addicts in a robbery years earlier. Eggsy and Harry fight Whiskey in Poppy's diner and ultimately kill him by shoving him into a meat grinder. Whiskey is by far the deadliest physical antagonist in the entire Kingsman series, since it took the combined skill of both Harry and Eggsy to kill him, with him still recovering from his headshot giving them an edge.

Ginger Ale
Ginger Ale (Halle Berry) is Statesman's tech support specialist. She was instrumental in saving Harry Hart's life after he was shot by Richmond Valentine in Kentucky, utilising Alpha Gel to save and restore his damaged brain tissue. She has sought a promotion to field agent status for several years, but Whiskey has always voted against her whenever a position becomes available. After Whiskey's death, she volunteers to take his place and is voted in by the membership.

Supporting characters
Michelle Unwin
Michelle Unwin (Samantha Womack) is Eggsy's mother. Many years after the death of her husband Lee, she marries Dean Baker and has a child with him, a daughter named Daisy. However, she and Eggsy are frequently abused by Dean. Just moments prior to the broadcast of Valentine's neurological wave, Michelle is told by Roxy to lock Daisy away from her. When Eggsy kills Valentine, he manages to stop his mother from killing his baby sister. After becoming a full-fledged Kingsman agent, Eggsy encourages his mother to leave Dean and move to a new home. Michelle makes a brief cameo appearance during Eggsy and Princess Tilde's wedding in Kingsman: The Golden Circle.

James Arnold
Professor James Arnold (Mark Hamill) is a university professor at Imperial College London, whose research specialises in climate change with focus on the Gaia hypothesis. He is based on the graphic novel's fictional portrayal of Hamill. Arnold is kidnapped by Valentine's men and taken to Argentina. Kingsman agent James Spencer / Lancelot attempts to rescue him, but is killed by Gazelle in the process. When Kingsman discovers that Arnold is alive and has returned to work in London, Harry pays him a visit. While Harry questions him about the circumstances of Lancelot's death, the chip implanted in Professor Arnold's neck is activated, causing his head to explode and injure Harry, who is barely able to escape Valentine's men.

Princess Tilde
Crown Princess Tilde of Sweden (Hanna Alström) is one of several dignitaries abducted by Valentine as part of his master plan to keep several important figures safe from his neurological wave broadcast. When Eggsy breaks into Valentine's secret lair, he stumbles upon a captive Princess Tilde, who promises to have anal sex with him if he saves the world. After Eggsy stops Valentine's plan, he goes back to her cell and has sex with her. In Kingsman: The Golden Circle, she and Eggsy are in a relationship and living together in London. While they are attending a formal dinner in Sweden with Princess Tilde's parents, the King and Queen, a missile attack kills all Kingsman personnel except for Eggsy and Merlin. Tilde gives Eggsy a new puppy to replace his dog JB, also killed in the strike, before he departs to bring down the Golden Circle cartel. She is distraught when Eggsy tells her the mission requires him to seduce another woman. This puts their relationship in jeopardy as she refuses to pick up Eggsy's calls, leaving him devastated. Later, Princess Tilde calls Eggsy in a state of mania, alerting him that she has been infected with the drugs. She is cured with the antidotes and at the end of the film, she marries Eggsy.

Brandon
Brandon (Calvin Demba) is one of Eggsy's close friends. While babysitting Eggsy's pug J.B., Brandon discovers Kingsman gadgets in Eggsy's study room before he and J.B. are killed by a missile intended for Eggsy.

Fox
Fox (Emily Watson) is the White House Chief of Staff. A recreational drug user, she is arrested and quarantined when the President refuses to give into Poppy's demands and instead decides to detain all those affected by the virus and allow them to die. After Poppy's plans are foiled, Fox is instrumental in getting the President impeached for openly refusing to help those affected by the virus.

Elton John
In Kingsman: The Golden Circle, famed singer-songwriter Elton John is abducted by Poppy Adams and forced to perform concerts in her secret lair Poppy Land. While in captivity, he develops a blue rash after using one of Poppy's recreational drugs. During her televised message to the President of the United States, Poppy demonstrates the antidote of her toxin on a paralysed Elton. When Eggsy and Harry storm through Poppy Land, Elton helps Harry destroy one of Poppy's robot attack dogs and promises him two tickets and a backstage pass if Kingsman saves the world. He is last seen as the organ player at Eggsy and Princess Tilde's wedding.

Conrad Oxford
Conrad Oxford (Harris Dickinson) is the son of Orlando, Duke of Oxford. Upon the outbreak of World War I, he is forbidden by his father to join the British Army. Upon reaching the age of 19, Conrad enlists in the Army. Upon arriving at the Western Front, he is summoned back to Britain, but he switches places with Lance Corporal Archie Reid, who is sent to deliver a message to Orlando. Taking the guise of Archie and joining the Black Watch, Conrad volunteers for a mission into No-Man's Land to retrieve information from a British spy wounded there. A grueling hand-to-hand battle with German soldiers makes him realize he made a mistake in joining the war, but he is comforted by the spy. At the break of dawn, Conrad carries the spy back to the British side, but the spy is killed by a German artillery explosion. Conrad succeeds in retrieving the information, but is mistaken for a German spy upon his return and executed at gunpoint. However, the information collected by the spy is the proof President Wilson required to enter the war. Conrad is posthumously awarded the Victoria Cross by King George V.

Emily Oxford
Emily Oxford (Alexandra Maria Lara) is the wife of Orlando, Duke of Oxford. She and a young Conrad (Alexander Shaw) accompany Orlando to a concentration camp as part of a Red Cross convoy during the Second Boer War. Upon the convoy's arrival, Emily is fatally shot by a Boer sniper in a failed attempt to assassinate Herbert Kitchener. Emily is loosely based on Emily Hobhouse, an English activist who exposed the deplorable conditions of the British concentration camps during the Second Boer War.

Herbert Kitchener
Herbert Kitchener, 1st Earl Kitchener (Charles Dance) is the Secretary of State for War and a close friend of Orlando, Duke of Oxford. Following the failed assassination attempt on him during the Second Boer War that killed Emily Oxford, Kitchener makes a promise to Orlando that he would never allow Conrad to enlist in the British Army during World War I. Upon learning that Tsar Nicholas II is being manipulated by Grigori Rasputin, he travels to Russia to meet with the Tsar, but is killed when HMS Hampshire is torpedoed by a submarine helmed by the Shepherd. With Kitchener dead, Conrad joins the war against his father's wishes.

Tsar Nicholas II
Nicholas II of Russia (Tom Hollander) is the Tsar of the Russian Empire and the first cousin of King George V of England and Kaiser Wilhelm II of Germany. He declares war on Germany in retaliation to Wilhelm declaring war on Serbia following the assassination of Austro-Hungarian Archduke Franz Ferdinand. When his advisor Grigori Rasputin poisons his son Alexei, he is forced to pull out of the war in order to save his son. Following the February Revolution Nicholas abdicates the throne, bringing an end to the Russian Empire. The entire Romanov clan is subsequently assassinated after the war.

Woodrow Wilson
Woodrow Wilson (Ian Kelly) is the President of the United States during World War I. Despite the sinking of the RMS Lusitania, which kills 128 American citizens, Wilson keeps the U.S. neutral. When he is presented the intercepted Zimmerman Telegram by Britain, he hesitates to declare war, insisting on more concrete evidence. As a means to keep America out of the war, the Shepherd has Mata Hari seduce him in the White House and blackmail him with the filmed footage. Following the fall of the Flock, the negative of the film footage is delivered to Wilson, who promptly destroys it and declares war on Germany.

Felix Yusupov
Felix Yusupov (Aaron Vodovoz) is a member of the aristocratic House of Yusupov and Conrad's cousin. He writes a letter to Conrad, informing him that Grigori Rasputin has been manipulating Tsar Nicholas during the war.

Franz Ferdinand
Archduke Franz Ferdinand of Austria (Ron Cook) is the heir presumptive to the throne of Austria-Hungary. He and his wife Sophie are assassinated by Gavrilo Princip in Sarajevo, prompting Germany to instigate World War I.

Antagonists

Kingsman: The Secret Service (2015)
Richmond Valentine
The main antagonist of Kingsman: The Secret Service, Richmond Valentine (Samuel L. Jackson) is a tech industry billionaire philanthropist who speaks with a lisp and has a weak stomach for violence, to the extent that he vomits at the sight of blood. He is based on Dr. James Arnold (not related to Hamill's character) in the graphic novel. Valentine is extremely concerned with global warming, and after several failed environmental projects, comes to the conclusion that mankind is both the cause and the problem. Valentine begins to distribute free SIM cards offering unlimited phone and Internet coverage worldwide, planning to use them to transmit a neurological wave that triggers aggression and switches off inhibitors in the brain, which will result in mass killing worldwide and thus reduce the global population. At the same time, he abducts hundreds of celebrities and dignitaries believing them to be too important to kill, while making deals with those who agree with his plan by implanting an electronic device on their necks that make them immune to the broadcast.

Whilst testing the effects of the SIM cards on a religious hate group in Kentucky, Kingsman agent Harry Hart (who was investigating the church's connection to Valentine) falls victim to the transmission, killing everyone inside. Valentine confronts him, and after revealing his plan to Hart shoots him in the head, an act that causes him to nearly throw up in disgust. Following the church incident, Valentine initiates "V-Day", when he plans to broadcast his neurological wave on a global scale. Valentine's mountain stronghold is later infiltrated by Eggsy, who is impersonating the late Chester King / Arthur who betrayed Kingsman and sided with Valentine. After an intense gunfight with Valentine's security guards, Eggsy and Merlin are able to gain the upper hand by activating explosives in the implants, which Valentine planned to detonate only should the user betray him, killing all his associates. Despite causing significant casualties worldwide with his neurological wave, he is killed after Eggsy spears him in the back with one of his deceased henchwoman Gazelle's leg blades.

Gazelle
Gazelle (Sofia Boutella) is Valentine's bodyguard and right-hand woman, loosely based on the character of the same name from the graphic novel. Having lost her legs at a young age, she walks using metallic appendages that double as razor sharp blades. Despite her handicap, she is an Olympic gymnast and a master of hand-to-hand combat, making her a force to be reconned with. It is she who kills James Spencer, the original "Lancelot", in Argentina. She is also instrumental in the kidnapping of Crown Princess Tilde of Sweden, murdering her two bodyguards when they try to intervene. After a long bout of hand-to-hand combat, Gazelle is killed by Eggsy, who cuts her arm with a poison-tipped shoe blade.

Dean Baker
Dean Baker (Geoff Bell) is Eggsy's mentally unstable and improperly raised stepfather, and the powerful leader of a criminal gang in London. He takes pleasure in abusing both Eggsy and his mother. After his gang mates are knocked out by Harry in the bar, Dean threatens to kill Eggsy before Harry stops him remotely, threatening to expose his criminal activities if he harms Eggsy. Dean and his gang are not heard from again after Eggsy enters the local pub as a Kingsman agent and knocks him out with a beer mug and defeats most of his gang. It is also unclear if he was arrested for his actions afterwards since he and his gang do not appear in the sequel.

Poodle
Poodle (Jordan Long) is a member of Dean's deadbeat gang. During the gang's confrontation with Harry at the pub, he is knocked out after Harry wraps his arm on the bar counter with an electric chain.

Rottweiler
Rottweiler (Morgan Watkins) is a member of Dean's gang. After a heated argument at the pub, Eggsy and his friends steal Rottweiler's Subaru Impreza WRX and take it for a joyride before they get into an accident and Eggsy is arrested. When the gang confronts Harry at the pub the next day, Harry knocks out Rottweiler with a stun bullet from his umbrella.

Fanatic Church Leader
The Fanatic Church Leader (Corey Johnson) runs the Kentucky-based South Glade Mission Church, a recognised hate group and a parody of the Westboro Baptist Church. As he is giving a sermon to his followers, Valentine activates his neurological wave through the SIM cards of the followers to the tune of Lynyrd Skynyrd's "Free Bird", causing everyone in the church - including Harry - to go on a killing spree. The massacre ends when Harry impales a spear through the church leader's head, leaving himself as the only survivor.

Morten Lindström
Morten Lindström (Bjørn Floberg) is the republican Prime Minister of Sweden. He betrays Princess Tilde and sides with Valentine, allowing her to be kidnapped. Lindström is among the few dignitaries who travel to Valentine's secret lair during V-Day. He is killed when Merlin sets off the explosive implants on all of Valentine's followers.

Kingsman: The Golden Circle (2017)
Poppy Adams
Poppy Adams (Julianne Moore) is the main antagonist of Kingsman: The Golden Circle. A graduate of Harvard Business School, she runs the world's largest drug cartel and has a theme park-like lair in the jungles of Cambodia called "Poppy Land", which is themed after 1950s Americana due to her love of 1970s films and TV programmes that immortalise the era. Despite having essentially a monopoly on the recreational drug trade, she does not take drugs, or consume other addictive substances such as sugar or alcohol. Poppy utilises robots in addition to people to provide security, noting that they are much more loyal and better at following orders. Two of such robots are cybernetic attack dogs named Bennie and Jet, named after the Elton John song "Bennie and the Jets". She is mentioned to suffer from an unspecified mental illness, and displays psychopathic tendencies.

Poppy laces a toxin within every recreational drug available, which causes users to develop blue rashes all over their body before progressing through mania, paralysis, and ultimately, death. With millions of users affected by the blue rash, she offers the antidote to the world if the President of the United States ends the war on drugs and makes her organisation legally immune. When Harry and Eggsy break through her lair, Poppy is forced to give them the password to the remote control for the antidote drones after Eggsy injects her with a large dose of heroin which contains a considerably more potent version of her toxin engineered by Merlin. After giving the password, she immediately dies, not from the effects of the virus, but from a heroin overdose.

Charlie Hesketh
Charles "Charlie" Hesketh (Edward Holcroft) is a Kingsman trainee who is eliminated in the semifinals after failing the railroad tracks test when he reveals the organisation to his interrogator. Due to his wealthy and influential background, he and his family are invited into Valentine's secret lair prior to V-Day. Just when Charlie spots Eggsy in the lair, he is knocked out after being shocked with Eggsy's electric signet ring.

It is revealed in Kingsman: The Golden Circle that the electric shock dislodged the explosive implant on Charlie's neck, saving him from self-destruction, but causing him to lose his right arm and vocal chords upon the implant's detonation. He is recruited into the Golden Circle by Poppy Adams and is given a cybernetic arm and voice box before exacting his revenge against Eggsy and Kingsman. He loses the arm during a car chase and fight with Eggsy, but upon Eggsy's escape from the authorities, the arm hacks into Kingsman's database through the car, giving Poppy all the information to destroy the organisation's establishments in Britain. (Eggsy and Merlin are the only survivors of the attack; Eggsy because he was away from home at the time and Merlin because his address was not listed in the Kingsman database.) While fighting Eggsy hand-to-hand at Poppy Land, Charlie is forced to disconnect the arm after Eggsy hacks into its programming with his watch. Eggsy then defeats Charlie with one arm behind his back and breaks his neck to avenge the deaths of the Kingsman agents, saying that he is more of a gentleman than Charlie ever was.

Charles
Charles (Keith Allen) is a member of Golden Circle who introduces Poppy to his friend Angel. However, as part of his initiation, Angel is ordered by Poppy to kill Charles by forcing him through a meat grinder.

Angel
Angel (Tom Benedict Knight) is a newly recruited thug in the Golden Circle. After killing Charles, he has his teeth filed, his fingerprints erased, and a 24 karat golden ring tattooed on his chest before Poppy makes him eat a hamburger made of Charles' remains as part of his initiation. Angel is killed by Poppy's robot attack dogs after secretly using her recreational drugs with Elton John.

Clara Von Gluckfberg
Clara Von Gluckfberg (Poppy Delevingne) is Charlie's ex-girlfriend who is tagged by Kingsman and Statesman as their lead to the Golden Circle. At the Glastonbury Festival, Eggsy plants a tracking device in her. When she develops the blue rash after taking drugs at the festival, she unknowingly leads Harry, Eggsy, and Whiskey to the antidote factory in northern Italy after her communication with Charlie is intercepted. Before escaping with the antidote sample, Eggsy lets slip to Charlie that he and Clara almost slept together. Fueled by rage and jealousy, Charlie kills Clara and destroys the antidote factory by activating its self-destruct mechanism.

President of the United States
The President of the United States (Bruce Greenwood) is whom Poppy Adams delivered her ultimatum to, as she believes the United Nations has no "teeth". He decides to use Poppy's threats to his advantage, choosing instead to declare martial law and quarantine all those affected by the virus. He believes allowing the "junkie scum" to die from the effects of the virus will both eradicate drug use in the United States and allow his administration to claim they have won the war on drugs. Not discriminating against who is detained, he even has Fox, his Chief of Staff, quarantined when she develops the blue rash. After the antidote is released worldwide, Fox has the President impeached for conspiring to commit mass genocide on all drug users.

Drunk Redneck gang
This gang of rednecks plays a similar role to Dean's gang. After Merlin gives Harry a new pair of glasses with one lens tinted to cover up his injury, the leader, implied to be named Moonshine (Nicholas Colicos), starts to approach Merlin, Harry, Eggsy and Agent Whiskey and acts aggressively to Harry. Harry decides to teach the redneck gang a lesson by quoting the same Manner's Maketh Man speech he did to Rotweiller and Poodle. Unlike his encounter with the London yobs, Harry starts seeing butterflies which malfunctions his focus with the rednecks. Just as one of them traps Harry with his umbrella, Whiskey lassos Harry to safety and he defeats the rednecks.

The King's Man (2021)
The Shepherd
The Shepherd (Matthew Goode) is the main antagonist of The King's Man. He is the leader of a secret organisation known as "The Flock", with the motive of instigating World War I to bankrupt Europe and manipulate the British, German, and Russian empires into destroying each other. The Flock's headquarters is a goat farm on top of a mountain somewhere in Central Europe. The Shepherd is revealed to be Captain Max Morton, aide-de-camp to Herbert Kitchener. Morton secretly founded the Flock as revenge on the British Empire for oppressing his home of Scotland for over 700 years, and on the English aristocrats who stole his parents' mill. He fakes his death and kills Kitchener to ensure that Russia pulls out of the war and Germany focuses on annihilating the UK. Orlando confronts Morton at the Flock's stronghold and engages him in a sword fight until Morton falls to his death. The Shepherd is partially based on Fritz Joubert Duquesne, a South African soldier who spied for the Boers during the Second Boer War and the Germans during World War I, and became known as "the man who killed Kitchener" due to his claims of directing a U-boat to sink HMS Hampshire.

Grigori Rasputin
Grigori Rasputin (Rhys Ifans) is a Russian monk and a trusted adviser to Tsar Nicholas of Russia while secretly being a second-in-command of the Flock, bearing the ring of the tortoise. On the orders of the Shepherd, Rasputin poisons Nicholas' son Alexei and persuades Nicholas to leave the war to save his son. Upon learning that Rasputin has been manipulating the Romanovs, Orlando, Conrad, Polly, and Shola travel to the Winter Palace in Petrograd to assassinate the monk. Their plan to poison him with a cyanide-laced Bakewell tart fails due to his immunity to poisons. After an intense sword fight, Orlando stabs Rasputin through the chest and drowns him in a frozen pool, but when the monk suddenly gets up, Polly shoots him in the head.

Erik Jan Hanussen
Erik Jan Hanussen (Daniel Brühl) is an adviser to Kaiser Wilhelm II while secretly being a third-in-command of the Flock, bearing the ring of the dog. He has the Kaiser send the Zimmermann Telegram to have Mexico declare war on the U.S. to prevent the latter nation from joining the UK in the war. The plan backfires when Polly, with the help of domestics in both Germany and Mexico, cracks the code, allowing the UK to inform the U.S. of Germany's deceptive tactic. Following the end of the war, Hanussen becomes the new Shepherd.

Kaiser Wilhelm II
Wilhelm II, German Emperor (Tom Hollander) is the Kaiser of the German Empire, and first cousin of King George V of England and Tsar Nicholas II of Russia. Following the assassination of Archduke Franz Ferdinand, Wilhelm declares war on Serbia, leading to World War I. He abdicates the throne following the end of the war, effectively bringing an end to the German Empire.

Gavrilo Princip
Gavrilo Princip (Joel Basman) is a Bosnian Serb student and a fourth-in-command of the Flock, bearing the ring of the bear. He is assigned by the Shepherd to assassinate Austro-Hungarian Archduke Franz Ferdinand in Sarajevo. Princip's first attempt fails after Conrad deflects the bomb thrown at the Archduke's car, but hours later, he succeeds in killing the Archduke and his wife Sophie when their car runs into him at a dead end. He is arrested and later interrogated by Orlando, who learns that the assassination was planned to instigate World War I.

Mata Hari
Mata Hari (Valerie Pachner) is a Dutch exotic dancer and a fifth-in-command of the Flock. Upon learning that the Zimmermann Telegram is intercepted and forwarded to the White House, the Shepherd has Mata Hari seduce President Woodrow Wilson and blackmail him with the filmed footage to prevent him from declaring war on Germany. She is apprehended by Orlando at the U.S. Embassy in London and her cashmere scarf is instrumental in locating the Flock's base of operations.

Vladimir Lenin
Vladimir Lenin (August Diehl) is a Russian politician and a member of the Flock. Following the assassination of Rasputin, the Shepherd orders Lenin to have Russia pull out of the war. With the February Revolution, Lenin succeeds in forcing Tsar Nicholas to abdicate the throne.

Alfred du Pont
Alfred I. du Pont (Todd Boyce) is a member of the du Pont family and the Flock. He is ordered by the Shepherd to deliver the negative film of Mata Hari seducing President Wilson to the press as a means to incite Wilson's impeachment and keep the U.S. out of the war. du Pont is killed at the Flock's stronghold when Polly breaks the rope-drawn lift, sending him crashing to the ground. The negative film is recovered and sent to Wilson, who destroys it and proceeds to declare war on Germany.

Huge Machine Shack Guard
The huge machine shack guard (Olivier Richters) is in charge of the rope-drawn lift at the Flock's headquarters. He fights Orlando in the shack, displaying his resistance to pain from Orlando's sword and throwing knives before he is decapitated by Shola.

Adolf Hitler
Towards the end of World War I, a moustached man (David Kross) ensures that Kaiser Wilhelm II signs his letter of abdication at gunpoint, and later assassinates Tsar Nicholas and his family. He joins the Flock, now led by Erik Jan Hanussen, and introduces himself to Vladimir Lenin as Adolf Hitler.

References

Lists of film characters
Characters